Joseph J. Weiser (December 25, 1912 – September 17, 2004) was an American politician who served in the New York State Assembly from New York's 6th district from 1955 to 1962.

He died on September 17, 2004, in Hollywood, Florida at age 91.

References

1912 births
2004 deaths
Democratic Party members of the New York State Assembly
20th-century American politicians